Mkondo wa Simiti is a river in Kenya's Coast Province.

References 

Geography of Kenya